Xavier Romeu Matta is a counselor and litigator, with expertise in securities litigation and regulation, and corporate, commercial and employment litigation. He is a former politician, and an advocate of statehood for Puerto Rico, and of the appointment of Puerto Rican-Americans to the federal bench, most notably of current Associate Justice of the United States Supreme Court, Sonia Sotomayor, whom he served as a law clerk.

Biography
Mr. Romeu was born and raised in Puerto Rico where his family resided since 1813. Following graduation from the Academia del Perpetuo Socorro in Miramar, he attended Haverford College in Pennsylvania, where he was Secretary, Vice President and President of the Student Council.

As a student leader, Mr. Romeu pushed and obtained the approval by the Board of Directors of funding of a new student center (currently, the John C. Whitehead student center). He also led in the fight for weight room/ sport facilities and for funding of Skeeters, the student-run pizza business. He was a strong supporter of self-governing by students and actively opposed the college administration on a proposed campus-wide alcohol ban. He successfully advocated for accountability and individual responsibility for social events on campus. Mr. Romeu was graduated with Honors in Philosophy.

He lives and works in New York and is married, has a daughter, and continues to strongly advocate on Puerto Rican matters, and for equality for the U.S citizens of the Territory of Puerto Rico.

In May 2010 he was invited to testify before the White House Taskforce on Puerto Rico on the subject of economic development strategies for the island and the inextricable relationship between economic development and status.  Mr. Romeu explained that the island's colonial status has served as fertile ground for federal tax subsidies to the pharmaceutical and manufacturing industry for revenues realized, and patents held, in the U.S. Territory, but that the exceptions no longer increase job creation. Mr. Romeu advocated extension of a wage and job based tax credit, instead of revenue based corporate tax subsidy, and extension of empowerment zone status to all of Puerto Rico.

Public office
Xavier Romeu chaired the HNBA Governmental Affairs Committee. In that capacity, in 1998, he led the national coalition that broke the Republican Senate's hold on Judge Sonia Sotomayor's nomination to the United States Court of Appeals for the Second Circuit

Honors and recognition

 The Puerto Rico Institute Lifetime Achievement Award
 National Hispanic Corporate Achievers, Western Hemisphere Achiever of the Year
 Frank Torres Commitment to Diversity Award, Association of Judges of Hispanic Heritage
 Honorable Felipe N. Torres Award for Outstanding Latino Attorney of the Year

References

External links
Haverford Alumni profile

New Progressive Party (Puerto Rico) politicians
Secretaries of Economic Development and Commerce of Puerto Rico
Living people
Sullivan & Cromwell people
Haverford College alumni
Columbia Law School alumni
Fuqua School of Business alumni
Proskauer Rose people
Year of birth missing (living people)